Clinical trials can be promoted and funded by a variety of sponsors, including pharmaceutical companies, government, research charities, foundations, medical organizations, and voluntary groups, such as patients' associations.

Clinical trials are defined as independent when they are promoted by scientific organizations - academic or not-for-profit - and funded by public or charitable money, research centres or voluntary groups.

Pharmaceutical companies, in close collaboration with university researchers and clinicians, fund the majority of clinical studies on drugs and devices. These studies are product-oriented, aiming to test the benefits of a particular treatment.

Nevertheless, there is a large number of clinical research questions that are of little or no interest to commercial sponsors but still need to be addressed, given their importance to public health and to improving diagnosis and therapy for groups of patients of varying size. These questions are health problem-oriented, not treatment-orientated: Thus, "For this disease, this patient or group of patients, what is the best treatment option?" These questions refer not only to drugs and devices, but also to new biomedical interventions, surgery, physiotherapy, psychology, rehabilitation, training, etc. They are clearly of crucial importance for patients, caregivers, health systems and health insurance.

Independent clinical studies are of key importance for improving the effectiveness, safety and cost/benefit balance, such as the long-term risks and rare adverse reactions to treatments, comparing the available treatment options, evaluating the hoped-for improvements in quality of life or in follow-up of procedures and rehabilitation strategies. Investing in independent clinical research brings dividends for society in terms of reducing the impact of diseases, improving care strategies, and containing costs of health systems.

References

Clinical trials